Eilema aspersa is a moth of the subfamily Arctiinae first described by Arthur Gardiner Butler in 1882. It can be found in Madagascar.

References

Moths described in 1882
aspersa